Christopher Lamb may refer to:

 Christopher John Lamb (1950–2009), biologist
 Chris Lamb (born 1981), Australian rules football player
 Chris Lamb (baseball) (born 1990), Australian baseball pitcher
 Chris Lamb (software developer) (born 1985), British free software developer and advocate
 Christopher Lamb (journalist) (born 1982), British journalist
 Christopher Lamb (ski jumper) (born 1989), American ski jumper

See also
Lamb (surname)